"Bye Bye Blackbird" is a song published in 1926 by Jerome H. Remick and written by composer Ray Henderson and lyricist Mort Dixon. It is considered a popular standard and was first recorded by Sam Lanin's Dance Orchestra in March 1926.

Song information 
Popular recordings in 1926 were by Nick Lucas, Gene Austin, Benny Krueger, and by Leo Reisman. It was the number 16 song of 1926 according to Pop Culture Madness.

In popular culture
The song was featured in the 1955 movie musical Pete Kelly's Blues, sung by Peggy Lee in the role of alcoholic jazz singer Rose Hopkins.

In "Goodbye Nkrumah" (1966) Beat poet Diane Di Prima asks:And yet, where would we be without the American culture
Bye bye blackbird, as Miles plays it, in the ’50s

In 1982, the Recording Industry Association of America (RIAA) posthumously awarded John Coltrane a "Best Jazz Solo Performance" Grammy for the work on his album Bye Bye Blackbird.

Recordings of the song often include only the chorus; the verses are far less known.

Segregationists opposed to the American Civil Rights Movement, notably at the Selma to Montgomery marches, played the song over loudspeakers as a taunt.

See also
List of 1920s jazz standards
My Blue Heaven

References

Further reading

 

1926 songs
Songs with lyrics by Mort Dixon
Songs with music by Ray Henderson
1920s jazz standards